The U Thant Peace Award was created by Sri Chinmoy's peace meditations at the United Nations, after U Thant's death. First offered in 1982, the award is given to individuals and organizations who have exemplified the lofty spiritual ideals of the late United Nations Secretary-General U Thant and implemented those ideals in the tireless pursuit of world peace.

Recipients
It had been bestowed by The Peace Meditation at the United Nations upon Nelson Mandela, Mikhail Gorbachev, Pope John Paul II, Mother Teresa, Javier Perez de Cuellar, Kurt Waldheim  the Dalai Lama, Desmond Tutu, Dada J.P. Vaswani, Swami Satchidananda and U Thant's daughter, Daw Aye Aye Thant.

The U Thant Distinguished Lecture Series is a forum through which eminent thinkers and world leaders speak on the role of the United Nations in addressing the challenges facing the world's peoples and nations in the 21st century. The lecture series is co-organized by the United Nations University and the Science Council of Japan.

The UNU has a tradition of inviting world leaders and renowned individuals to Tokyo to explore the role of the United Nations in a rapidly changing world. The U Thant Distinguished Lecture Series builds upon this tradition by providing an opportunity for Nobel laureates and heads of state, current and former, to share their insights and experiences with scholars, policymakers, business leaders and the public.

Recipients of the U Thant Peace award

References

External links
 U Thant Peace Award at Sri Chinmoy.org
 Video: Award for Mother Teresa 

Awards established in 1982
Peace awards
Sri Chinmoy